Santa María Ajoloapan is a town inside municipality of Hueypoxtla in Mexico State in Mexico. The town is bordered on the north Tianguistongo Town, south to Casa Blanca hacienda, east village San José Bata and west by the town of Coyotillos in Apaxco.

References

Populated places in the State of Mexico
Hueypoxtla
Otomi settlements
Nahua settlements